Robert Palmer, JP (31 January 1793 – 24 November 1872) was an English gentleman from Berkshire and Tory/Conservative Member of Parliament.

The son of Robert Palmer Senior and Jane Bowles, he lived at Holme Park in Sonning. Active in county politics, he was a magistrate in 1815 and High Sheriff of Berkshire in 1818. In his will, he endowed 'Robert Palmer's Almshouse Charity,' which remains active today.

Notes

1793 births
1872 deaths
Tory MPs (pre-1834)
Conservative Party (UK) MPs for English constituencies
High Sheriffs of Berkshire
People from Sonning
UK MPs 1820–1826
UK MPs 1826–1830
UK MPs 1830–1831
UK MPs 1832–1835
UK MPs 1835–1837
UK MPs 1837–1841
UK MPs 1841–1847
UK MPs 1847–1852
UK MPs 1852–1857
UK MPs 1857–1859
Members of the Parliament of the United Kingdom for Berkshire